The Thracian Tomb of Kazanlak (Kazanlǎška grobnica) is a vaulted-brickwork "beehive" (tholos) tomb that is located near the town of Kazanlak in central Bulgaria.

The tomb is part of a large royal Thracian necropolis in the Valley of the Thracian Rulers near their ancient capital of Seuthopolis in a region where more than a thousand tombs of royalty and members of the Thracian aristocracy can be found.

The monument dates back to the fourth century BC and has been on the UNESCO protected World Heritage Site list since 1979. The paintings in this small tomb are Bulgaria's best-preserved artistic masterpieces from the Hellenistic period.

The site consists of a narrow corridor leading to a round, domed chamber of the size required for the burial. Both are painted and decorated with murals representing a Thracian couple at a ritual funeral feast. The murals were created in fresco. The walls were painted with a sanguine or dark reddish color.

The dome mural in this tomb shows a seated couple grasping each other's wrists as others approach in a procession with trays and various items as well as attendees. The couple is seated separatetly on differing ornate chairs. Bulgarian art historian Lyudmila Zhivkova interprets the shared gesture between the central figures as indicative of a moment of tenderness and equality, but that interpretation is not shared by all specialists. Horn musicians are shown playing their instruments as they walk in the procession. The mural shows horses in several situations: saddled horses are being led or held without riders, an attendant holds the team of horses drawing an awaiting chariot, and a chariot race in progress is depicted at the top of the dome. The main border at the foundation of this domb celing mural features cattle skulls that are draped with scarfs of material across their horns that alternates with images of an equilateral-cross design interpreted as a flower. Among other borders that are dividing the dome mural, one band of ornamentation contains an egg-and-dart pattern of Hellenistic style while others display stripes, dentation, and imagery that may have had specific cultural or familial significance. 

To preserve the delicate paintings, the tomb is not open to the public, however, a full-size and exact replica was built nearby for public access.

In contemporary culture 
The seated woman of the domb mural is depicted on the reverse of the Bulgarian 50 stotinki coin that was issued in 2005.

Gallery

See also 
 Thracian tomb of Aleksandrovo
 Thracian tomb of Cotys I
 Thracian tomb Golyama Arsenalka
 Thracian tomb Griffins
 Thracian tomb Helvetia
 Thracian tomb Ostrusha
 Thracian tomb of Seuthes III
 Thracian tomb Shushmanets
 Thracian Tomb of Sveshtari
 Valley of the Thracian Rulers
 Roman Tomb (Silistra)

Tombs in Bulgaria
Thracian sites

References

External links 

 „The Thracian Tomb in Kazanluk“, book by Dafina Vasileva
  Images of the Thracian Tomb of Kazanlak

Buildings and structures completed in the 4th century BC
Thracian sites
World Heritage Sites in Bulgaria
Archaeological sites in Bulgaria
Buildings and structures in Stara Zagora Province
Kazanlak
Tourist attractions in Stara Zagora Province
Tombs in Bulgaria
History of Stara Zagora Province
Beehive tombs